The Rockies Express Pipeline is a  long high-pressure natural gas pipeline system from the Rocky Mountains of Colorado to eastern Ohio. The pipeline system consists of three sections running through eight states.  It is one of the largest natural gas pipelines ever built in North America.

History

The final section of the pipeline was completed on 12 November 2009.

Technical description
The initial cost of the pipeline was around US$5 billion.

REX  Entrega (Zone 1) 

Construction of this pipeline was authorized in August 2005. The pipeline project was acquired by Rockies Express Pipeline, LLC in February 2006.

REX  West (Zone 2) 

On 31 May 2006, the Rockies Express Pipeline filed an application to construct and operate this section. The construction approval was issued by the Federal Energy Regulatory Commission (FERC) on 20 April 2007. It is in full service since 16 May 2008.

REX  East (Zone 3) 
The Rockies Express Pipeline filed an application to construct and operate this section on 30 April 2007 and the FERC issued approval on 30 May 2008.

In June 2014, REX placed the Seneca Lateral into initial service and in January 2015, the Seneca Lateral was placed into full service with the ability to move approximately  onto the REX mainline in Zone 3.

The initial cost of the pipeline was around $5 billion.

REX has filed with FERC for a  expansion of its Zone 3 east-to-west capacity, via compression additions. This project is anticipated to be completed in Q4 2016.

Partnership
The pipeline is operated by Rockies Express Pipeline, LLC, a partnership between Tallgrass Energy Partners, Phillips 66 and Sempra Energy. In February 2006, Kinder Morgan Energy Partners and Sempra Energy acquired Entrega Gas Pipeline Inc., from EnCana Corporation.  In June 2006, ConocoPhillips acquired 24% of the project. ConocoPhillips spun off the downstream part of its business in May 2012.

Environmental concerns
The pipeline project has raised some environmental concerns. Ohio officials have asked to avoid crossing the Big Darby Creek in Pickaway County and the Little Miami River in Warren County within Caesar Creek State Park because of the risk of harming fish and other wildlife posed by drilling the pipeline beneath the rivers.

A Lawsuit by American Energy Corporation was filed against REX over the disruption of coal mine owned by AEC beneath REX. In light of past pipeline accidents, where subsiding abandoned mines have caused pipelines to fail, the wisdom of the location of that part of the REX pipeline is of concern to pipeline industry critics.

See also
 List of oil pipelines

References

External links
 Rockies Express Pipeline
 

Natural gas pipelines in the United States
Energy in Colorado
Energy in Missouri
Energy in Ohio
Phillips 66
Sempra Energy
Energy infrastructure completed in 2009
Natural gas pipelines in Colorado
Natural gas pipelines in Wyoming
Natural gas pipelines in Nebraska
Natural gas pipelines in Kansas
Natural gas pipelines in Missouri
Natural gas pipelines in Illinois
Natural gas pipelines in Indiana
Natural gas pipelines in Ohio